The 2018 Wigan Metropolitan Borough Council election took place on 3 May 2018 to elect members of Wigan Metropolitan Borough Council in England. This was on the same day as other local elections.

Overview
Prior to the election, the composition of the council was:

Labour Party: 65
Conservative Party: 5
Independents: 3
Wigan Independents: 2

After the election, the composition of the council was:
Labour Party: 60
Conservative Party: 7
Independents: 6
Wigan Independents: 2

Results Summary

Results

Bolton West constituency

Atherton ward

Leigh constituency

Astley Mosley Common ward

Atherleigh ward

Golborne and Lowton West ward

Leigh East ward

Leigh South ward

Leigh West ward

Lowton East ward

Tyldesley ward

Makerfield constituency

Abram ward

Ashton ward

Bryn ward

Hindley ward

Hindley Green ward

Orrell ward

Winstanley ward

Worsley Mesnes ward

Wigan constituency

Aspull, New Springs and Whelley ward

Douglas ward

Ince ward

Pemberton ward

Shevington with Lower Ground ward

"Shevington Independents" is a description used by candidates for the Wigan Independents.

Standish with Langtree ward

"Standish Independents" is a description used by candidates for the Wigan Independents.

Wigan Central ward

Wigan West ward

References

External links 
 Election results by ward

2018 English local elections
2018
2010s in Greater Manchester